The Extraordinary and Plenipotentiary Ambassador of Peru to the Kingdom of Denmark was the official representative of the Republic of Peru to the Kingdom of Denmark, resident in Copenhagen.

Peru maintained an embassy in Copenhagen from 1957 until its closure in 1988. It was reopened in 1999, but closed permanently in 2003. The Peruvian ambassador in Stockholm has been accredited to Denmark during the 1990s and since 2003, with a brief exception from 2011 to 2012, where the Peruvian ambassador in Berlin was accredited instead.

List of representatives

See also
List of ambassadors of Peru to Finland
List of ambassadors of Peru to Norway
List of ambassadors of Peru to Sweden

References

Denmark
Peru